Hasanabad (also Romanized as Ḩasanābād; also known as Ḩasanābād-e Deh Zamīn) is a village in Beyhaq Rural District, Sheshtomad District, Sabzevar County, Razavi Khorasan Province, Iran. At the 2006 census, its population was 127, in 53 families.

References 

Populated places in Sabzevar County